Caloptilia teleodelta is a moth of the family Gracillariidae. It is known from Maharashtra and Uttaranchal, India.

The larvae feed on Flueggia microcarpa and Flueggia virosa. They mine the leaves of their host plant.

References

teleodelta
Moths of Asia
Moths described in 1926